Asura quadrilineata is a moth of the family Erebidae. It is found on Aru and in Australia (the Northern Territory and Queensland).

Subspecies
Asura quadrilineata quadrilineata
Asura quadrilineata moluccensis van Eecke, 1929 (Buru)

References

quadrilineata
Moths described in 1886
Moths of Indonesia
Moths of Australia